Ernest Charles Frederick Stroud  (20 May 1931 – 2014) was Archdeacon of Colchester from 1983 to 1997.

He was educated at Merrywood Grammar School and Durham University. and  ordained in 1961.  He worked for Esso before ordination in 1961. After a curacy in South Kirkby he was Priest in charge at St Ninian, Whitby. He was Vicar of  All Saints, Chelmsford then  of St Margaret of Antioch, Leigh on Sea before his years as an Archdeacon.

Notes

1931 births
People educated at Merrywood Grammar School
Archdeacons of Colchester
Living people
Alumni of St Chad's College, Durham